The following is a list of programs that have aired on Paramount Network, an American pay television channel owned by the Paramount Media Networks division of Paramount Global.

Original programming

Current original programming

Drama

Unscripted

Reality

Former original programming

Scripted

Docuseries

Unscripted

Reality

Sports

Original special programming
I Am Paul Walker (August 11, 2018)
I Am Patrick Swayze (August 18, 2019)

Upcoming original programming
6666 (2023)

Syndicated programming

Current
 Two and a Half Men (2018–present)
 The Office (2019–present)
 NCIS (2021–present)
 Law & Order (2023–present)

Former
 American Ninja Warrior (2018)
 Friends (2018–2019)
 M*A*S*H (2018)
 Mom (2018–2022)
 Roseanne (2018)
 America's Most Musical Family (2019)
 The King of Queens (2019–2020)
 The New Adventures of Old Christine (2019)
 Yes, Dear (2019)
 Without a Trace (2020)
 The Fresh Prince of Bel-Air (2021)
 South Park (2022)

See also
 List of programs broadcast by Spike

Notes

References

External links

 
Paramount